Mile Ilić (born 2 June 1984) is a Serbian podcaster and former professional basketball player.

Known in Serbia as Jao Mile (word play referencing Yao Ming and the Serbian expression for ouch, jao), the 2.15-metre-tall (7'1") center won two Adriatic League championships with KK FMP. Additionally, he played with the New Jersey Nets of the National Basketball Association (NBA) during the 2006–07 season, having been drafted one year earlier as the 43rd overall pick.

Early life and career
Born to a Serb family in Tuzla, SR Bosnia and Herzegovina, SFR Yugoslavia due to it being the nearest town with a maternity ward, young Mile was raised in a Lopare area settlement of  together with two older siblings, including sister  (born 1973) who would soon begin pursuing basketball with the Jedinstvo Aida youth squads and eventually grow to 193 cm in height.

After coming up through the Jedinstvo Aida youth system for years, in 1990, youngster Mile's sixteen-year-old sister Slavica Ilić made the team's full squad as replacement at center for celebrated future FIBA Hall of Famer Razija Mujanović who had just transferred abroad to play with CB Godella in Spain.

With the outbreak of the Bosnian War in spring 1992, eighteen-year-old Slavica fled the armed conflict area for Belgrade, Serbia where she resumed playing professionally, finding a spot on the ŽKK Partizan roster quickly. Several months later, during summer 1992, her younger eight-year-old brother Mile, who had just finished the first grade of elementary school, was sent by their parents to join her, while the parents and the middle brother stayed behind in their Serb majority home village that had by this time become the scene of fierce shelling by the Muslim forces from the neighbouring hillside settlement of Teočak. Their father soon joined the armed conflict, fighting as part of the Republika Srpska Army (VRS). Meanwhile in Belgrade, joining his eighteen-year-old professional basketball player sister, eight-year-old child Mile, by his own admission in interviews decades later, initially spent majority of his day riding the city's public transit while waiting for his sister to finish her daily basketball practices. In September 1992, he resumed his schooling, starting second grade at a primary school in Belgrade. However, being cared and provided for by his teenage sister only, without any parental supervision, soon proved untenable and, following a disciplinary incident at school, a decision was made for him to return to his parents in the war zone. The youngster spent the following year and a half attending school in makeshift facilities in his village, before going back to Belgrade in 1994 to rejoin his sister. 

Upon returning to Belgrade, encouraged by his sister Slavica, the tall ten-year-old began practicing basketball by enrolling in KK Partizan's youth categories coached by Aleksandar Bućan. Living with his older sister in a Konjarnik neighbourhood apartment provided for by her basketball salary, in addition to attending primary school, pre-teen Mile bussed to Partizan youth team practices at the 20th October Elementary School gym facilities on the other side of Belgrade in Blok 70.

By 1996, Slavica Ilić secured a transfer abroad to France with Stade Clermontois BF and twelve-year-old Mile rejoined their parents by moving back to Bosnia where the war had ended in the meantime. Still in primary school, he continued pursuing basketball, this time within the KK Rudar Ugljevik youth categories.

Though now part of a small provincial club well off the radar for most basketball scouts, teenage Ilić kept drawing attention due to his exceptional height and, by 1999, he was scouted by KK Hemofarm's head coach Željko Lukajić who facilitated his transfer to the Vršac club where the fifteen-year-old youngster got assigned to its youth categories. Following a tryout with KK Hemofarm's youth team in late summer 1999, head coach Petar Rodić reportedly liked teenage Ilić, however, due to the club's 1999-00 youth squad already being completed, he did not get placed on the team right away and returned back to Ugljevik. Some ten days later, the team created a roster spot for him and the tall teenager joined KK Hemofarm, a club financed by the state-owned pharmaceutical company of the same name led by CEO .

Coached by Rodić, teenage Ilić played for the KK Hemofarm youth team alongside fellow youngsters Darko Miličić, Miljan Pupović, Nenad Mišanović, Vukašin Aleksić, Marko Kolarić, Nikola Tutuš, etc.

Playing career

FMP
After three seasons in KK Hemofarm's youth system, seeing his opportunities of entering the club's first team limited, Ilić decided to unilaterally leave Vršac during summer 2002 and transfer to YUBA League rivals FMP. The legal basis he took advantage of for doing so was an unmet clause in his stipend-based contract at Hemofarm that stipulated the club's obligation to provide the youth player with a professional contract by the time he turns eighteen years of age.

Arriving in Železnik, to a club run by club president and owner Nebojša Čović and sporting director Ratko Radovanović, eighteen-year-old Ilić thus started his first team, full squad career.

In the 2005 NBA Draft he was drafted by the New Jersey Nets as a 43rd overall pick.

New Jersey Nets 
Having been drafted one year earlier in 2005, Ilić signed for the Nets on 13 September 2006 once a roster spot opened due to Zoran Planinić leaving the club. Initially, twenty-two-year-old Ilić was brought in as a foreseeable future backup for countryman Nenad Krstić with the Nets' general manager Ed Stefanski singling out Ilić's lateral movement, pick-and-roll, and defensive help as well as his overall adaptation to the speed of the NBA game as the areas the NBA rookie needs to improve in.

On 26 February 2007 the Nets assigned him to the Colorado 14ers, their NBA Development League affiliate. Ilić thus became the first player that the Nets assigned to the D-League since instituting affiliate teams (prior to the 2005–06 NBA season). Playing for the 14ers based out of Broomfield, Colorado, his Development League season ended early due to an ankle joint injury in early April 2007. The injury would end up having a major impact on his basketball career in subsequent years.

On 29 October 2007 he was traded by the Nets to New Orleans Hornets along with Bernard Robinson for David Wesley (both Ilić and Robinson were immediately waived by the Hornets).

Return to Europe 
After getting waived in the NBA, Ilić returned to Europe and signed with Lokomotiv Rostov on 26 November 2007. However, he never managed to play for the Russian club due to the effects of the nagging ankle injury he had picked up in the United States and then exacerbated at the EuroBasket 2007 training camp with Serbia national team. Instead, the center went back home to Serbia in order to further rehab his ankle.

Spain
On 24 February 2008, midway through the 2007-08 season, Ilić signed with the Spanish ACB league club CB Bilbao Berri. Hampered by the recovery process from the ankle injury, he only appeared in 10 games for the club, averaging 5.6 points and 4.1 rebounds per game.

On 28 July 2008, Ilić signed with CB Sevilla for the 2008–09 season. Playing on a squad with compatriot Duško Savanović under head coach Pedro Martínez, Ilić's not-fully-healed ankle injury got exacerbated again and he started missing games again. On 27 March 2009, he parted ways with Sevilla after averaging only 2 points and 2 rebounds per game.

The 2009-10 season began with Ilić without a club as teams shied away from acquiring the tall center due to concerns over his re-occurring ankle injury.

Seasons in Serbia 
After ten months away from competitive basketball, Ilić found a club in March 2010, signing for the remainder of the season with Metalac Valjevo that decided to acquire him after qualifying for the Superleague stage of their Serbian Basketball League campaign.

For the 2010–11 season he returned to FMP Železnik.

The 2011–12 season he played with Crvena zvezda. In March 2013, signed with Vojvodina Srbijagas for the 2012–13 Serbian Superleague season.

Seasons in the Middle East and stints in Georgia and Lithuania 
In October 2013, Ilić signed with Mahram Tehran BC of the Iranian Super League. In January 2014, he left Tehran and signed with MIA Academy of the Georgian Super Liga for the rest of the season.

In 2015, Ilić played for Qatar Sports Club of the Qatari League. On 17 October 2015 he signed with the Lithuanian club Lietkabelis Panevėžys.

In September 2016, Ilić signed with Nuwaidrat of the Bahraini Premier League. At the end of March 2017, Ilić signed with Tadamon Zouk of the Lebanese Basketball League. In July 2017, he returned to Nuwaidrat. In September 2018, Ilić signed for a Bahraini club Al Itihad.

In summer 2019, Ilić played for Al Seeb of the Oman League. In July 2019, he signed for a Bahraini club Al-Ahli. Prior to the 2019–20 season, Ilić signed for Baniyas of the UAE National League.

National team
During late August 2003, nineteen-year-old Ilić represented Serbia-Montenegro at the 2003 Summer Universiade in Daegu, South Korea as part of the country's university basketball team. The makeshift squad consisting of ten FMP Železnik players plus Milan Bralović and Marko Marinović from Borac Čačak was put together by FMP's head coach Vlade Đurović on a short notice. Following an arduous 36-hour journey from Belgrade via London, Hong Kong, Taipei, and Seoul, the team arrived in Daegu less than 12 hours before its opening game, a hard-fought win versus Chinese Taipei. Serbia-Montenegro ended up winning gold.

Full squad
In summer 2006, fresh off winning the Adriatic League with FMP, Ilić was called up for the national team duty by head coach Dragan Šakota as part of the selection process for the upcoming 2006 FIBA World Championship in Japan. The center ended up making the 12-man roster taken to the tournament where he played as backup to Darko Miličić.

One year later, Ilić was called up to the training camp for EuroBasket 2007 by the new head coach Moka Slavnić. Carrying an ankle injury from his time in the U.S., hesitant Ilić still showed up on the insistence of head coach Slavnić who reportedly called the player personally on multiple occasions, convincing him eventually. At the training camp, Ilić exacerbated his ankle injury and in the end did not make the 12-man roster, with Slavnić picking Miličić and Dragan Labović for center spots. Together with Aleksandar Rašić, Ilić was among the last two players cut from the squad in late August 2007, right before the start of the championship.

At the beginning of summer 2011, after completing a return season with FMP, Ilić was called up by the Serbia national team head coach Dušan Ivković for the EuroBasket 2011 training camp. Ilić made it to the last 16, this time, before getting cut by Ivković in early August 2011 together with Novica Veličković.

Career statistics

NBA

Regular season

|-
| style="text-align:left;"|
| style="text-align:left;"|New Jersey
| 5 || 0 || 1.2 || .000 || — || — || .2 || .0 || .0 || .0 || .0

Post-playing career 
In March 2022, Ilić started his podcast show named Jao Mile.

See also 
 List of Serbian NBA players

References

External links
 
 Profile at Asia-basket.com
ACB.com profile
FIBA.com profile
Profile at 5na5.rs

1984 births
Living people
2006 FIBA World Championship players
ABA League players
Basketball League of Serbia players
BC Lietkabelis players
Bilbao Basket players
Bosnia and Herzegovina expatriate basketball people in Serbia
Bosnia and Herzegovina expatriate basketball people in the United States
Real Betis Baloncesto players
Centers (basketball)
Colorado 14ers players
KK Crvena zvezda players
KK FMP (1991–2011) players
KK Metalac Valjevo players
KK Vojvodina Srbijagas players
Liga ACB players
Mahram Tehran BC players
Medalists at the 2003 Summer Universiade
National Basketball Association players from Serbia
New Jersey Nets draft picks
New Jersey Nets players
Sportspeople from Tuzla
Serbian expatriate basketball people in Bahrain
Serbian expatriate basketball people in Georgia (country)
Serbian expatriate basketball people in Iran
Serbian expatriate basketball people in Lebanon
Serbian expatriate basketball people in Lithuania
Serbian expatriate basketball people in Monaco
Serbian expatriate basketball people in Oman
Serbian expatriate basketball people in Qatar
Serbian expatriate basketball people in Spain
Serbian expatriate basketball people in the United Arab Emirates
Serbian expatriate basketball people in the United States
Serbian men's basketball players
Serbs of Bosnia and Herzegovina
Universiade gold medalists for Serbia and Montenegro
Universiade medalists in basketball
YouTube podcasters
Serbian YouTubers